Nilsebuvatnet is a lake in the municipalities of Sandnes and Hjelmeland in Rogaland county, Norway. The lake is regulated by a small dam on the southwest corner of the lake. The dam provides water for the Lysebotn power station. The lake drains out into the river Storåna which flows westward towards Årdal. The lake is accessible by a small service road from Lysebotn which leads up to the dam.

See also
List of lakes in Norway

References

Hjelmeland
Sandnes
Lakes of Rogaland